Dopey may refer to:
 Dopey (Disney), a character in Snow White and the Seven Dwarfs and related media
 "Dopey" (Land of the Lost), an episode of Land of the Lost
 Dopey (podcast), a podcast about drug addiction
 "Dopey" Benny Fein, a gang leader in the Labor Slugger Wars in New York City in the early 20th century
 Dean Haydenbaugh or Dopey, American drummer

See also
 Dope (disambiguation)
 Doping (disambiguation)